Madeleine L'Engle (November 29, 1918 – September 6, 2007) was an American writer of fiction, non-fiction, poetry, and young adult fiction, including A Wrinkle in Time and its sequels: A Wind in the Door, A Swiftly Tilting Planet, Many Waters, and An Acceptable Time. Her works reflect both her Christian faith and her strong interest in modern science.

Early life
Madeleine L'Engle Camp was born in New York City on November 29, 1918, and named after her great-grandmother, Madeleine Margaret L'Engle, otherwise known as Mado. Her maternal grandfather was Florida banker Bion Barnett, co-founder of Barnett Bank in Jacksonville, Florida. Her mother, a pianist, was also named Madeleine: Madeleine Hall Barnett. Her father, Charles Wadsworth Camp, was a writer, critic, and foreign correspondent who, according to his daughter, suffered lung damage from mustard gas during World War I.

L'Engle wrote her first story at age of five and began keeping a journal at age eight. These early literary attempts did not translate into academic success at the New York City private school where she was enrolled. A shy, clumsy child, she was branded as stupid by some of her teachers. Unable to please them, she retreated into her own world of books and writing. Her parents often disagreed about how to raise her, and as a result she attended a number of boarding schools and had many governesses. 

The Camps traveled frequently. At one point, the family moved to a château near Chamonix in the French Alps, in what Madeleine described as the hope that the cleaner air would be easier on her father's lungs. Madeleine was sent to a boarding school in Switzerland. However, in 1933, L'Engle's grandmother fell ill, and they moved near Jacksonville, Florida to be close to her. L'Engle attended another boarding school, Ashley Hall, in Charleston, South Carolina. When her father died in October 1936, Madeleine arrived home too late to say goodbye.

Education, marriage, and family
L'Engle attended Smith College from 1937 to 1941. After graduating cum laude from Smith, she moved to an apartment in New York City. L'Engle published her novels The Small Rain and Ilsa prior to 1942. She met actor  Hugh Franklin that year when she appeared in the play The Cherry Orchard by Anton Chekhov, and she married him on January 26, 1946.  Later she wrote of their meeting and marriage, "We met in The Cherry Orchard and were married in The Joyous Season." The couple's first daughter, Josephine, was born in 1947.

The family moved to a 200-year-old farmhouse called Crosswicks in the small town of Goshen, Connecticut in 1952. To replace Franklin's lost acting income, they purchased and operated a small general store, while L'Engle continued with her writing. Their son Bion was born that same year. Four years later, seven-year-old Maria, the daughter of family friends who had died, came to live with the Franklins and they adopted her shortly thereafter.  During this period, L'Engle also served as choir director of the local Congregational church.

Writing career
L'Engle determined to give up writing on her 40th birthday (November 1958) when she received yet another rejection notice. "With all the hours I spent writing, I was still not pulling my own weight financially."  Soon she discovered both that she could not give it up and that she had continued to work on fiction subconsciously.

The family returned to New York City in 1959 so that Hugh could resume his acting career. The move was immediately preceded by a ten-week cross-country camping trip, during which L'Engle first had the idea for her most famous novel, A Wrinkle in Time, which she completed by 1960. It was rejected more than thirty times before she handed it to John C. Farrar; it was finally published by Farrar, Straus and Giroux in 1962.

In 1960 the Franklins moved to an apartment on the Upper West Side,  in the Cleburne Building on West End Avenue.  From 1960 to 1966 (and again in 1986, 1989 and 1990), L'Engle taught at St. Hilda's & St. Hugh's School in New York. In 1965 she became a volunteer librarian at the Cathedral of St. John the Divine, also in New York. She later served for many years as writer-in-residence at the cathedral, generally spending her winters in New York and her summers at Crosswicks.

During the 1960s, 1970s, and 1980s, L'Engle wrote dozens of books for children and adults. Four of the books for adults formed the Crosswicks Journals series of autobiographical memoirs. Of these, The Summer of the Great-grandmother (1974) discusses L'Engle's personal experience caring for her aged mother, and Two-Part Invention (1988) is a memoir of her marriage, completed after her husband's death from cancer on September 26, 1986.

On writing for children
Soon after winning the Newbery Medal for her 1962 "junior novel" A Wrinkle in Time, L'Engle discussed children's books in The New York Times Book Review. The writer of a good children's book, she observed, may need to return to the "intuitive understanding of his own childhood," being childlike although not childish.  She claimed, "It's often possible to make demands of a child that couldn't be made of an adult... A child will often understand scientific concepts that would baffle an adult. This is because he can understand with a leap of the imagination that is denied the grown-up who has acquired the little knowledge that is a dangerous thing." Of philosophy, etc., as well as science, "the child will come to it with an open mind, whereas many adults come closed to an open book. This is one reason so many writers turn to fantasy (which children claim as their own) when they have something important and difficult to say."

Religious beliefs
L'Engle was a Christian who attended Episcopal churches and believed in universal salvation, writing that "All will be redeemed in God's fullness of time, all, not just the small portion of the population who have been given the grace to know and accept Christ. All the strayed and stolen sheep. All the little lost ones." As a result of her promotion of Christian universalism, many Christian bookstores refused to carry her books, which were also frequently banned from Christian schools and libraries. At the same time, some of her most secular critics attacked her work for being too religious.

Her views on divine punishment were similar to those of George MacDonald, who also had a large influence on her fictional work. She said "I cannot believe that God wants punishment to go on interminably any more than does a loving parent. The entire purpose of loving punishment is to teach, and it lasts only as long as is needed for the lesson. And the lesson is always love."

In 1982, L'Engle reflected on how suffering had taught her. She told how suffering a "lonely solitude" as a child taught her about the "world of the imagination" that enabled her to write for children. Later she suffered a "decade of failure" after her first books were published. It was a "bitter" experience, yet she wrote that she had "learned a lot of valuable lessons" that enabled her to persevere as a writer.

Later years, death, and legacy
L'Engle was seriously injured in an automobile accident in 1991, but recovered well enough to visit Antarctica in 1992. Her son, Bion Franklin, died on December 17, 1999, from the effects of prolonged alcoholism. He was 47 years old.

In her final years, L'Engle became unable to teach or travel due to reduced mobility from osteoporosis, especially after suffering an intracerebral hemorrhage in 2002. She also abandoned her former schedule of speaking engagements and seminars. A few compilations of older work, some of it previously unpublished, appeared after 2001.

L'Engle died of natural causes at Rose Haven, a nursing facility close to her home in Litchfield, Connecticut, on September 6, 2007, according to a statement made by her publicist the following day.
She is interred in the Cathedral of St. John the Divine in Manhattan.

In 2018, her granddaughters Charlotte Jones Voiklis and Léna Roy published Becoming Madeleine: A Biography of the Author of A Wrinkle in Time by Her Granddaughters.

A Light So Lovely: The Spiritual Legacy of Madeleine L’Engle by Sarah Arthur was also published in 2018.

L'Engle's A Wrinkle in Time was adapted into a film twice by Disney. A television film, directed by John Kent Harrison, premiered on May 10, 2004. When asked in an interview with Newsweek if the film "met her expectations", L'Engle said, "I have glimpsed it. ... I expected it to be bad, and it is." A theatrical film, directed by Ava DuVernay, premiered March 9, 2018.

In celebration of L'Engle's centenary year, Writing for Your Life hosted the inaugural Madeleine L'Engle Conference: Walking on Water on November 16, 2019, in New York City, New York, at All Angels' Church on the Upper West Side. Katherine Paterson served as the keynote speaker.

Awards, honors, and organizations
In addition to the numerous awards, medals, and prizes won by individual books L'Engle wrote, she personally received many honors over the years. These included being named an Associate Dame of Justice in the Venerable Order of Saint John (1972); the USM Medallion from The University of Southern Mississippi (1978); the Smith College Medal "for service to community or college which exemplifies the purposes of liberal arts education" (1981); the Sophia Award for distinction in her field (1984); the Regina Medal (1985); the ALAN Award for outstanding contribution to adolescent literature, presented by the National Council of Teachers of English (1987); and the Kerlan Award (1991).

In 1985 she was a guest speaker at the Library of Congress, giving a speech entitled "Dare to be Creative!" That same year she began a two-year term as president of the Authors Guild.  In addition she received over a dozen honorary degrees from as many colleges and universities, such as Haverford College. Many of these name her as a Doctor of Humane Letters, but she was also made a Doctor of Literature and a Doctor of Sacred Theology, the latter at Berkeley Divinity School in 1984. In 1995 she was writer-in-residence for Victoria Magazine. In 1997 she was recognized for Lifetime Achievement from the World Fantasy Awards.

L'Engle received the annual Margaret A. Edwards Award from the American Library Association in 1998.  The Edwards Award recognizes one writer and a particular body of work for a "significant and lasting contribution to young adult literature." Four books by L'Engle were cited: Meet the Austins, A Wrinkle In Time, A Swiftly Tilting Planet, and A Ring of Endless Light (published 1960 to 1980). In 2004 she received the National Humanities Medal but could not attend the ceremony due to poor health.

L'Engle was inducted into the New York Writers Hall of Fame in 2011.

In a 2012 survey of School Library Journal readers, A Wrinkle in Time was voted the best children's novel after Charlotte's Web.

In 2013, a crater on Mercury was named after L'Engle.

At Smith College, a fellowship is available in L'Engle's name to visit and use the special collections available there. This fund provides stipends to support travel by researchers—from novices to advanced, award-winning scholars—to explore the resources available in the Smith College Archives, Mortimer Rare Book Collection, and Sophia Smith Collection of Women's History.

The Madeleine L'Engle Collection
Since 1976, Wheaton College in Illinois has maintained a special collection of L'Engle's papers, and a variety of other materials, dating back to 1919. The Madeleine L'Engle Collection includes manuscripts for the majority of her published and unpublished works, as well as interviews, photographs, audio and video presentations, and an extensive array of correspondence with both adults and children, including artwork sent to her by children.

In 2019, a collection of 43 linear feet of L'Engle's family, personal, and literary papers came to the Sophia Smith Collection of Women's History at Smith College. They had been donated by her literary estate.

Bibliographic overview
L'Engle's best-known works are divided between the "Chronos" and "Kairos" frameworks. The former is the framework in which the stories of the Austin family take place and is presented in a primarily realistic setting, though occasionally with elements that might be regarded as science fiction. The latter is the framework in which the stories of the Murry and O'Keefe families take place and is presented sometimes in a realistic setting and sometimes in a more fantastic or magical milieu. Generally speaking, the more realistic Kairos material is found in the O'Keefe stories, which deal with the second-generation characters.  However, the Murry-O'Keefe and Austin families should not be regarded as living in separate worlds, because several characters cross over between them, and historical events are also shared.

In addition to novels and poetry, L'Engle wrote many nonfiction works, including the autobiographical Crosswicks Journals and other explorations of the subjects of faith and art. For L'Engle, who wrote repeatedly about "story as truth", the distinction between fiction and memoir was sometimes blurred. Real events from her life and family history made their way into some of her novels, while fictional elements, such as assumed names for people and places, can be found in her published journals.

A theme in L'Engle's works, often implied and occasionally explicit, is that the phenomena that people call religion, science, and magic are simply different aspects of a single seamless reality.

Important L'Engle characters

Most of L'Engle's novels from A Wrinkle in Time onward are centered on a cast of recurring characters, who sometimes reappear decades older than when they were first introduced. The "Kairos" books are about the Murry and O'Keefe families, with Meg Murry and Calvin O'Keefe marrying and producing the next generation's protagonist, Polyhymnia O'Keefe. L'Engle wrote about both generations concurrently, with Polly (originally spelled Poly) first appearing in 1965, well before the second book about her parents as teenagers (A Wind in the Door, 1973). The "Chronos" books center on Vicky Austin and her siblings. Although Vicky's appearances all occur during her childhood and teenage years, her sister Suzy also appears as an adult in A Severed Wasp, with a husband and teenage children. In addition, two of L'Engle's early protagonists, Katherine Forrester and Camilla Dickinson, reappear as elderly women in later novels. Rounding out the cast are several characters "who cross and connect": Canon Tallis, Adam Eddington, and Zachary Gray, who each appear in both the Kairos and Chronos books.

Works

Novels for young adults 

Chronos & Kairos series:
 Chronos (The Austin Family Chronicles):
 Meet the Austins (1960) 
 The Moon by Night (1963) 
 2.5. The Twenty-four Days Before Christmas (1984) )
 The Young Unicorns (1968) 
 A Ring of Endless Light (1980)  (Newbery Honor Book)
 4.5. The Anti-Muffins (1980) 
 Troubling a Star (1994) 
 5.4. Two short stories included in Miracle on 10th Street: And Other Christmas Writings (1998)
 5.6. A Full House: An Austin Family Christmas (1999) )
 5.7. "Rob Austin and the Millenium Bug", a short story included in the anthology Second Sight: Stories for a New Millenium (1999) 
 Kairos (The Murry-O'Keefe Family Chronicles):
 First-generation (Murry series):
 A Wrinkle in Time (1962; Newbery Award Winner) 
 A Wind in the Door (1973) 
 2.5. Intergalactic P.S. 3 (1970) 
 A Swiftly Tilting Planet (1978)  —National Book Award in category Children's Books (paperback).
 Many Waters (1986) 
 Second-generation (O'Keefe Family series):
 The Arm of the Starfish (1965) 
 Dragons in the Waters (1976) 
 A House Like a Lotus (1984) 
 An Acceptable Time (1989) 

Stand-alone releases:
 And Both Were Young (1949), revised and reissued with new material (1983) 
 The Journey with Jonah (1967) 
 The Joys of Love (2008)

Novels 

Katherine Forrester Vigneras series:
 The Small Rain (1945) 
 Prelude (1968), no ISBN, an adaptation of the first half of The Small Rain
 A Severed Wasp (1982) 

Camilla Dickinson series:
 Camilla Dickinson (1951), later republished in slightly different form as Camilla (1965), novel of young adult 
 A Live Coal in the Sea (1996) 

Stand-alones:
 Ilsa (1946) 
 A Winter's Love (1957), 
 The Love Letters (1966), revised and reissued as Love Letters (2000) 
 The Other Side of the Sun (1971) 
 Certain Women (1992) 
Note: some ISBNs given are for later paperback editions, since no such numbering existed when L'Engle's earlier titles were published in hardcover.

Children's books 

Picture books:
 Dance in the Desert (1969) 
 The Glorious Impossible (1990) 
 The Other Dog (2001) 
 A Book, Too, Can Be a Star (2022), a picture book biography of Madeleine L'Engle

Short stories 

Collections:
 The Sphinx at Dawn: Two Stories (1982), collection of 2 short stories:
 "Pakko's Camel", "The Sphinx at Dawn"
 101st Miracle: Early Short Stories by Madeleine L'Engle (1999), collection of 12 short stories: 
 "Poor Little Saturday", "Six Good People", and more. (Although there is an ISBN listed, there is no record of this title ever being published.)
 The Moment of Tenderness (2020), collection of 18 short stories

Poems 

Collections:
 The Weather of the Heart: Selected Poems (1978)
 Wintersong: Christmas Readings (1996, with Luci Shaw) 
 Mothers And Daughters (1997) 
 The Ordering of Love: The New and Collected Poems of Madeleine L'Engle (2005), collection of nearly 200 poems, including 18 that have never before been published: 
 "Lines Scribbled on an Envelope", "The Weather of the Heart", "A Cry Like a Bell", and more

Plays 

 18 Washington Square South: A Comedy In One Act (1944)

Non-fiction 

Autobiographies and memoirs

Crosswicks Journals series:
 A Circle of Quiet (1972) 
 The Summer of the Great-grandmother (1974) 
 The Irrational Season (1977) 
 Two-Part Invention: The Story of a Marriage (1988)  (U.K. and Australia title: From This Day Forward)

Stand-alones:
 Glimpses of Grace: Daily Thoughts and Reflections (1996, with Carole F. Chase) 
 Friends for the Journey (1997, with Luci Shaw) 
 My Own Small Place: Developing the Writing Life (1998)  (Although there is a ISBN for this title, there is no record of it having ever been released.)
 

Religion

Genesis Trilogy:
 And It Was Good: Reflections on Beginnings (1983) 
 A Stone for a Pillow (1986) 
 Sold into Egypt (1989) 

Stand-alones:
 Everyday Prayers (1974) 
 Prayers for Sunday (1975) 
 Spirit And Light: Essays In Historical Theology (1976) 
 Ladder of Angels: Stories from the Bible Illustrated by Children of the World (1979) 
 Walking on Water: Reflections on Faith and Art (1980) 
 Trailing Clouds of Glory: Spiritual Values in Children's Literature (1985) 
 The Rock that is Higher: Story as Truth (1993)
 Anytime Prayers (1994) 
 Penguins and Golden Calves: Icons and Idols in Antarctica and Other Spiritual Places (1996) 
 Bright Evening Star: Mystery of the Incarnation (1997) 
 Miracle on 10th Street: And Other Christmas Writings (1998) 
 Includes two short stories about the Austin Family Chronicles series.
 A Prayerbook for Spiritual Friends (1999, with Luci Shaw) 
 Mothers and Sons (2000) 

Writing

 Dare To Be Creative!: A Lecture Presented At The Library Of Congress, November 16, 1983 (1984) 
 Do I Dare Disturb the Universe?: The Celebrated Speech (2012)

Adaptations 

 A Ring of Endless Light (2002), telefilm directed by Greg Beeman, based on young adult novel A Ring of Endless Light
 A Wrinkle in Time (2003), telefilm directed by John Kent Harrison, based on young adult novel A Wrinkle in Time
 Camilla Dickinson (2012), film directed by Cornelia Duryée, based on young adult novel Camilla Dickinson
 A Wrinkle in Time (2018), film directed by Ava DuVernay, based on young adult novel A Wrinkle in Time

Notes

References

Further reading

External links

  
 
 
 
 
 
 
 
 
 
 
 
 
 Madeleine L'Engle papers at the Sophia Smith Collection, Smith College
Interview with Madeline L'Engle about her 1990 Kerlan Award, All About Kids! TV Series #47 (1990)

1918 births
2007 deaths
20th-century American essayists
20th-century American novelists
20th-century American poets
20th-century American women writers
20th-century Christian universalists
21st-century Christian universalists
American children's writers
American Christian universalists
American expatriates in France
American expatriates in Switzerland
American fantasy writers
20th-century American memoirists
American women children's writers
American women essayists
American women novelists
American women poets
Anglican poets
Anglican universalists
American young adult novelists
Dames of Justice of the Order of St John
Margaret A. Edwards Award winners
National Book Award for Young People's Literature winners
National Humanities Medal recipients
Newbery Medal winners
Newbery Honor winners
Novelists from Connecticut
Novelists from Florida
Novelists from New York (state)
People from Litchfield, Connecticut
Smith College alumni
American women memoirists
Women science fiction and fantasy writers
Women writers of young adult literature
World Fantasy Award-winning writers
Writers from Jacksonville, Florida
Writers from New York City
Writers of young adult science fiction
20th-century American Episcopalians
Christian novelists
21st-century American women